Los Tres Reyes is one of the communities in the municipality of Benito Juárez Municipality, Quintana Roo.  It is effectively a commuter suburb located southwest of Cancún. It had a 2010 census population of 470 inhabitants and is situated at 8 meters (26 ft.) above sea level.

References

Populated places in Quintana Roo